The Chicago Sky are an American professional basketball team based in Chicago.  The Sky compete in the Women's National Basketball Association (WNBA) as a member club of the league's Eastern Conference. The franchise was founded prior to the 2006 season. The Sky experienced a period of success from 2013 to 2016, making four playoff appearances and playing in the 2014 WNBA Finals. They experienced a second period of success starting in 2019 and won their first championship in the 2021 WNBA Finals.

The team is owned by Michael J. Alter (principal owner) and Margaret Stender (minority owner). Unlike many other WNBA teams, it is not affiliated with a National Basketball Association (NBA) counterpart, although the Chicago Bulls play in the same market.

Franchise history

Franchise origin
In February 2005, NBA Commissioner David Stern announced that Chicago had been awarded a new WNBA franchise, temporarily named WNBA Chicago. On May 27, 2005, former NBA player and coach Dave Cowens was announced as the team's first head coach and general manager. The team home would be the UIC Pavilion. On September 20, 2005, the team name and logo formally debuted at an introduction event held at the Adler Planetarium. Team President and CEO Margaret Stender explained the team colors of yellow and blue represent "[a] beautiful day in Chicago between the blue sky and bright sunlight to highlight the spectacular skyline." The event was highlighted by the appearance of several star players, including Diana Taurasi, Temeka Johnson, Sue Bird, and Ruth Riley.

In November 2005, the team held an expansion draft to help build its roster of players. Among the notable selections were Brooke Wyckoff from the Connecticut Sun, Bernadette Ngoyisa from the San Antonio Silver Stars, Elaine Powell from the Detroit Shock, and Stacey Dales (who had retired prior to the 2005 season) from the Washington Mystics.

On February 28, 2006, the team announced that two of the minority shareholders of the team are Michelle Williams, from the vocal group Destiny's Child, and Mathew Knowles, father of Destiny's Child lead singer Beyoncé Knowles.

Early years and limited success (2006–2012)
In their first season, the Sky achieved a 5–29 record and finished last in the Eastern Conference. After the season, head coach Dave Cowens resigned to join the coaching staff of the Detroit Pistons. University of Missouri-Kansas City women's head basketball coach Bo Overton was named the Sky's new head coach and general manager on December 12, 2006. The Sky once again recorded a league-worst 5–29 record in 2006. Despite having the highest odds of drawing the first pick in the 2007 WNBA draft lottery, the Sky ended up with the third overall pick, which they used to select Armintie Price. The team was vastly improved in the 2007 season, but still finished with a 14–20 record and were two games behind the final playoff spot in the Eastern Conference. Price was named the 2007 WNBA Rookie of the Year. On March 12, 2008, the Sky announced that Overton had resigned his position of coach/general manager. Assistant coach Steven Key was named head coach/general manager.

With the second overall pick in the 2008 WNBA draft, the Sky selected Sylvia Fowles. In the 2008 season, the Sky would once again fail to make the playoffs, posting a 12–22 record, finishing 5th in the East. Fowles was injured for most of the season (she was, however, selected to play on the winning U.S. team at the 2008 Summer Olympics, where she average 13.4 points and 8.4 rebounds per game). In the 2009 WNBA draft, the Sky selected point guard Kristi Toliver with the third overall pick. Toliver had recently won the NCAA Women's Basketball Championship with the University of Maryland, where she had shot a game-tying three-point basket to send the game into overtime. In the 2009 season, the Sky contended for a playoff position, but finished with a record of 16-18 and lost a three-team tiebreaker to the Washington Mystics for the final playoff position. 

Entering the 2010 season, the Sky moved to Allstate Arena in the suburb of Rosemont, Illinois. The team's roster underwent several changes, highlighted by the trading away of Candice Dupree and Kristi Toliver and the acquisition of Shameka Christon and Cathrine Kraayeveld. At one point during the season, they were at .500, just a few games back for the final playoff spot. However, they lost eight of their final ten games and were eliminated from playoff contention, finishing with a 14–20 record. Key resigned as GM and coach, and was replaced on October 28, 2010, by former LSU head coach Pokey Chatman.

In 2011, the Sky were led again by Fowles, who averaged a double-double (20 points and 10.2 rebounds per game). The Sky once again finished the season at 14-20 but were encouraged by going 10-7 at home. The Sky selected Shey Peddy with the 23rd pick and Sydney Carter with the 27th pick in the 2012 WNBA draft. Peddy and Carter were both eventually waived on May 14, 2012. The Sky began the 2012 season 7-1, but finished 14–20 for the third consecutive season. The Sky remained the only WNBA franchise to never make the playoffs.

Playoff runs (2013–2016) 
The 2013 season was a turning point for the Sky. In the draft, they selected Elena Delle Donne with the second overall pick. Delle Donne became the first rookie to lead All-Star voting, averaging 18.1 points per game (fourth in the league) and leading the Sky to a 24-10 record and first place in the Eastern Conference. Delle Donne was named Rookie of the Year, Fowles was named Defensive Player of the Year and led the league in rebounds, and teammate Swin Cash received the Kim Perrot Sportsmanship Award. Chatman finished a close second for Coach of the Year, Delle Donne narrowly missed the MVP award, and Fowles and Delle Donne were named to the All-WNBA first and second teams. Reaching the playoffs for the first time, the Sky lost in the conference semifinals to the Indiana Fever.

In the 2014 season, the Sky posted an unimpressive 15-19 regular season record, but qualified for the playoffs as the 4th seed in the Eastern Conference. Guard Allie Quigley, who had grown up in nearby Joliet, Illinois, was named Sixth Woman of the Year. In the playoffs, they won two best-of-three series in the conference semifinals and finals to reach the WNBA Finals for the first time. In the best-of-five series, they were swept by the Phoenix Mercury in three games.

In February 2015, the Sky acquired Chicago native Cappie Pondexter from the New York Liberty in a straight-up trade for Epiphanny Prince. At the end of the 2015 season, they posted a 23-11 record and earned second place in the Eastern Conference. Delle Donne was named the league's Most Valuable Player, point guard Courtney Vandersloot led the league in assists, and Quigley was once again named Sixth Woman of the Year. Despite their improved regular season performance, the Sky fell to the Indiana Fever in the conference semifinals. 

In the 2016 season, under the WNBA's new playoff format where teams were seeded regardless of conference, the Sky finished 4th in the league and returned to the playoffs, but lost 3-1 in the semifinals to the Los Angeles Sparks.

Rebuilding (2017–2018) 
The Sky hired Amber Stocks as head coach and general manager, replacing Chatman, on December 6, 2016. During the 2016–17 offseason, in what was called one of the biggest trades in league history, the Sky traded Delle Donne to the Washington Mystics, receiving Kahleah Copper, Stefanie Dolson, and the Mystics' second overall pick in the 2017 WNBA draft. In the 2017 season, the Sky posted a 12–22 record and missed the playoffs for the first time in five seasons. In the ensuing 2018 WNBA draft, they selected Diamond DeShields and Gabby Williams in the first round. In the 2018 season, they posted a 13–21 record and missed the playoffs for a second consecutive season. On August 31, 2018, the Sky relieved Stocks as head coach and general manager. During these seasons, Courtney Vandersloot led the league in assists (setting a new assists-per-game record in 2017) and Allie Quigley won back-to-back Three-Point Contests at the All-Star Game.

Return to the playoffs and first championship (2019–present) 
In November 2018, the Sky hired James Wade as the team's new head coach and general manager. The Sky selected Katie Lou Samuelson in the first round of the 2019 WNBA draft and traded away Alaina Coates. The 2019 season would be a turnaround for the Sky, as they finished with a 20–14 record and entered the playoffs as a fifth seed. Wade received the WNBA Coach of the Year Award for the regular season, and Courtney Vandersloot exceeded her own assists-per-game record for the second straight season. Vandersloot, Allie Quigley, and Diamond DeShields were all named All-Stars, and DeShields won the All-Star Game Skills Challenge. In the playoffs, they defeated the Phoenix Mercury in the first round, but then lost to the Las Vegas Aces on the road on a buzzer-beater in the final seconds.

In the 2020 season, which was shortened and held in a bubble in Bradenton, Florida due to the COVID-19 pandemic, the Sky showed promise early in the season but battled injuries and ended the season with a sixth-seeded 12–10 record. They lost a first round single-elimination game to the Phoenix Mercury.

On February 1, 2021, the Sky announced the signing of free agent Candace Parker, a two-time WNBA MVP and WNBA Finals MVP. Parker, who had grown up in Naperville, Illinois and played her first 12 seasons in the league with the Los Angeles Sparks, stated that she wanted to return to her hometown team. The Sky had a volatile 2021 season, including a seven-game losing streak and a seven-game winning streak, which they ended with a 16-16 record. They entered the playoffs as the 6th seed, winning two single-elimination games and a semifinals series against the Connecticut Sun on their way to the Finals. On October 17, 2021, the Sky won their first WNBA Championship after defeating the Phoenix Mercury 3-1 in the 2021 WNBA Finals. Kahleah Copper was named the Finals MVP. A parade and rally to celebrate the team were held on October 19, 2021. Since the new playoff format was adopted, the Sky became the lowest-seeded team and first team without a winning record to win the championship.

Name, logo, and uniforms

Uniforms
 2006–2010: At home, white with light blue on the sides. Collar is light blue. On the road, light blue with gold on the sides. Collar is gold.
 2011–2012: At home, white with light blue stripes on the sides. Collar is light blue. On the road, light blue with gold stripes on the sides. Collar is gold. In addition, both the home and away uniforms feature the team nickname and numbers in gold.
 2013–2014: A new number and name font was introduced, while the basic uniform design was retained.
 2015: Magellan Corporation introduced as new Jersey sponsor. Unlike most teams with jersey sponsors, the Sky opted to emblazon the Magellan logo on the left shoulder in place of the team's alternate logo.
 2016: As part of a league-wide initiative, all games featured all-color uniform matchups. Therefore, the Sky unveiled a gold uniform in addition to their regular light blue road uniform. Magellan was retained as the uniform sponsor.
 2018: Magellan was joined by University of Chicago Medicine as jersey sponsors.

Season-by-season records

Players

Current roster

Former players
Cappie Pondexter (2015–2017)
Imani Boyette (2016–2017)
Tamera Young (2009–2017)
Monique Currie (2007)
Stacey Dales (2006–2007)
Elena Delle Donne (2013–2016), now a member of the Washington Mystics
Érika de Souza (2015–2016)
Clarissa dos Santos (2015-2016)
Candice Dupree (2006–2009), now a member of the Indiana Fever
Sylvia Fowles (2008–2014), now a member of the Minnesota Lynx
Cathrine Kraayeveld (2010–2011)
Stacey Lovelace-Tolbert (2006)
Nikki McCray (2006)
Chasity Melvin (2006–2008)
Bernadette Ngoyisa (2006–2007)
Chelsea Newton (2006)
Jia Perkins (2006–2010)
Elaine Powell (2006)
Ashley Robinson (2006)
Brooke Wyckoff (2006–2009)
Stefanie Dolson (2017-2021), now a member of New York Liberty

Coaches and staff

Owners
Michael J. Alter and Margaret Stender (2006–present)

Head coaches

General managers
Dave Cowens (2006)
Bo Overton (2007)
Steven Key (2008–2010)
Pokey Chatman (2011–2016)
Amber Stocks (2017–2018)
James Wade (2019–present)

Assistant coaches

Steven Key (2006–2007)
Roger Reding (2007)
Stephanie White (2007–2010)
Michael Mitchell (2008–2010)
Jeff House (2011–2012)
Christie Sides (2011–2016)
Tree Rollins (2013–2015)
Jonah Herscu (2016)
Carlene Mitchell (2017)
Awvee Storey (2017)
Carla Morrow (2018–2019)
Bridget Pettis (2019)
Olaf Lange (2020–2021)
Emre Vatansever (2020–present)
Tonya Edwards (2021–present)
Ann Wauters (2022-Present)

Statistics

|-
| 2006
| C. Dupree (13.7)
| B. Ngoyisa (5.7)
| J. Perkins (3.2)
| 68.3 vs 79.0
| 30.5 vs 36.4
| .394 vs .452
|-
| 2007
| C. Dupree (16.7)
| C. Dupree (7.7)
| D. Canty (4.1)
| 74.3 vs 76.8
| 34.3 vs 36.0
| .406 vs .429
|-
| 2008
| J. Perkins (17.0)
| C. Dupree (7.9)
| D. Canty (4.1)
| 72.7 vs 73.8
| 33.1 vs 34.1
| .428 vs .416
|-
| 2009
| C. Dupree (16.7)
| C. Dupree (7.9)
| D. Canty (3.2)
| 75.7 vs 79.2
| 31.9 vs 34.0
| .435 vs .442
|-

|-
| 2010
| S. Fowles (17.8)
| S. Fowles (9.9)
| D. Canty (3.4)
| 76.1 vs 76.8
| 31.7 vs 33.4
| .437 vs .444
|-
| 2011
| S. Fowles (20.0)
| S. Fowles (10.2)
| C. Vandersloot (3.7)
| 74.2 vs 75.2
| 33.8 vs 32.6
| .438 vs .418
|-
| 2012
| E. Prince (18.1)
| S. Fowles (10.4)
| C. Vandersloot (4.6)
| 75.2 vs 75.5
| 34.9 vs 30.1
| .431 vs .429
|-
| 2013
| E. Delle Donne (18.1)
| S. Fowles (11.5)
| C. Vandersloot (5.6)
| 79.4 vs 73.6
| 37.1 vs 33.2
| .420 vs .404
|-
| 2014
| E. Delle Donne (17.9)
| S. Fowles (10.2)
| C. Vandersloot (5.6)
| 76.2 vs 78.2
| 34.1 vs 35.6
| .434 vs .420
|-
| 2015
| E. Delle Donne (23.4)
| E. Delle Donne (8.4)
| C. Vandersloot (5.8)
| 82.9 vs 78.8
| 36.6 vs 33.6
| .446 vs .425
|-
| 2016
| E. Delle Donne (21.5)
| E. Delle Donne (7.0)
| C. Vandersloot (4.7)
| 86.2 vs 85.6
| 35.6 vs 32.9
| .462 vs .436
|-
| 2017
| A. Quigley (16.4)
| J. Breland (6.3)
| C. Vandersloot (8.1)
| 82.1 vs 87.2
| 33.8 vs 36.5
| .461 vs .435
|-
| 2018
| A. Quigley (15.4)
| Ch. Parker (5.8)
| C. Vandersloot (8.6)
| 83.8 vs 90.1 
| 33.1 vs 36.5
| .453 vs .462
|-
| 2019
| D. DeShields (16.2)
| J. Lavender (6.9)
| C. Vandersloot (9.1)
| 84.6 vs 83.3 
| 36.4 vs 35.4
| .448 vs .418
|-

|-
| 2020
| A. Quigley (15.4)
| Ch. Parker (6.4)
| C. Vandersloot (10.0)
| 86.7 vs 84.1
| 33.6 vs 32.2
| .491 vs .453
|-
| 2021
| K. Copper (14.4)
| Ca. Parker (8.4)
| C. Vandersloot (8.6)
| 83.3 vs 81.9
| 35.0 vs 35.9
| .441 vs .433
|-
| 2022
| K. Copper (15.7)
| Ca. Parker (8.6)
| C. Vandersloot (6.5)
| 86.3 vs 81.3
| 34.8 vs 33.2
| .481 vs .438

Media coverage
Currently, Sky games are broadcast locally in Chicago on WMEU-CD and WCIU-TV. Select Games are available on Marquee Sports Network. 2022 Marquee TV Schedule Select games are also broadcast in South Bend on WMYS-LD. Select games are broadcast nationally on ESPN or NBA TV. Broadcasters for the Sky games are Lisa Byington and Stephen Bardo.

The Sky was on radio for two seasons on WVON-AM 1690 with Les Grobstein on play-by-play and Tajua Catchings (whose sister Tamika Catchings is a star with the Indiana Fever) handling color. After 2008, WVON did not carry games any longer over a financial disagreement, and the Sky has not been on radio since. Their Home game only were carried on line during the 2008 season, but no Radio type play by play has been on since.

All games (excluding blackout games, which are available on ESPN3.com) are broadcast to the WNBA LiveAccess game feeds on the league website. Furthermore, some Sky games are broadcast nationally on ESPN, ESPN2 and ABC. The WNBA has reached an eight-year agreement with ESPN, which will pay right fees to the Sky, as well as other teams in the league.

All-time notes

Regular season attendance
A sellout for a basketball game at UIC Pavilion (2006–2009) is 6,972.
A sellout for a basketball game at Allstate Arena (2010–2017) is 17,500.
A sellout for a basketball game at Wintrust Arena (2018–present) is 10,387.

Draft picks
2006 Expansion Draft: Jia Perkins, Brooke Wyckoff, Elaine Powell, Kiesha Brown, Deanna Jackson, Laura Macchi, Stacey Lovelace, DeTrina White, Ashley Robinson, Chelsea Newton, Bernadette Ngoyisa, Francesca Zara, Stacey Dales
2006: Candice Dupree (6), Jennifer Harris (20), Kerri Gardin (34)
2007 Charlotte Dispersal Draft: Monique Currie (1)
2007: Armintie Price (3), Carla Thomas (10), Stephanie Raymond (20), Jessica Dickson (21), Jenna Rubino (27)
2008: Sylvia Fowles (2), Quianna Chaney (19), Angela Tisdale (33)
2009 Houston Dispersal Draft: Mistie Williams Bass (3)
2009: Kristi Toliver (3), Danielle Gant (16), Jennifer Risper (29)
2010 Sacramento Dispersal Draft: Courtney Paris (4)
2010: Epiphanny Prince (4), Abi Olajuwon (28)
2011: Courtney Vandersloot (3), Carolyn Swords (15), Angie Bjorklund (17), Amy Jaeschke (27)
2012: Shey Peddy (23), Sydney Carter (27)
2013: Elena Delle Donne (2), Brooklyn Pope (28)
2014: Markeisha Gatling (10), Gennifer Brandon (22), Jamierra Faulkner (34)
2015: Cheyenne Parker (5), Betnijah Laney (17), Aleighsa Welch (22)
2016: Imani Boyette (10), Jordan Jones (34)
2017: Alaina Coates (2), Tori Jankoska (9), Chantel Osahor (21), Makayla Epps (33)
2018: Diamond DeShields (3), Gabby Williams (4), Amarah Coleman (28)
2019: Katie Lou Samuelson (4), Chloe Jackson (15), María Conde (27)
2020: Ruthy Hebard (8), Japreece Dean (30), Kiah Gillespie (32)
2021: Shyla Heal (8), Natasha Mack (16)
2022: No Draft Picks

Trades
June 29, 2006: The Sky traded Ashley Robinson to the Seattle Storm in exchange for Cisti Greenwalt and a second-round pick in the 2007 Draft.
March 23, 2007: The Sky traded Chelsea Newton and the 21st pick in the 2007 Draft to the Sacramento Monarchs for the 10th pick in the 2007 Draft.
May 24, 2007: The Sky traded Monique Currie to the Washington Mystics in exchange for Chasity Melvin.
August 12, 2009: The Sky traded Armintie Price to the Atlanta Dream in exchange for Tamera Young.
March 30, 2010: The Sky traded Candice Dupree to the Phoenix Mercury and a second-round pick in the 2010 Draft to the New York Liberty in exchange for Shameka Christon and Cathrine Kraayeveld from New York. New York also received Cappie Pondexter and Kelly Mazzante from Phoenix.
May 13, 2010: The Sky traded Kristi Toliver to the Los Angeles Sparks in exchange for a second-round pick in the 2011 Draft.
April 20, 2011: The Sky traded Jia Perkins to the San Antonio Silver Stars in exchange for Michelle Snow.
June 1, 2011: The Sky traded a second-round pick in the 2012 Draft to the Los Angeles Sparks in exchange for Lindsay Wisdom-Hylton.
January 2, 2012: The Sky traded the second pick in the 2012 Draft to the Seattle Storm in exchange for Swin Cash, Le'coe Willingham, and the 23rd pick in the 2012 Draft.
March 14, 2012: The Sky traded a third-round pick in the 2013 Draft to the San Antonio Silver Stars in exchange for Sonja Petrovic.
May 7, 2014: The Sky traded Swin Cash to the Atlanta Dream in exchange for Courtney Clements.
February 16, 2015: The Sky traded Epiphanny Prince to the New York Liberty in exchange for Cappie Pondexter.
July 27, 2015: The Sky traded Sylvia Fowles and a second-round pick in the 2016 Draft to the Minnesota Lynx in exchange for Erika de Souza from Atlanta. Atlanta also received Damaris Dantas, Reshanda Gray, and a first-round pick in the 2016 Draft from Minnesota.
February 2, 2017: The Sky traded Elena Delle Donne to the Washington Mystics in exchange for Kahleah Copper, Stefanie Dolson, and the #2 overall pick in the 2017 Draft.
February 27, 2017: The Sky traded Clarissa Dos Santos to the San Antonio Stars in exchange for Astou Ndour.
May 20, 2019: The Sky traded their second round pick in the 2020 Draft to the Los Angeles Sparks in exchange for Jantel Lavender.
May 21, 2019: The Sky traded Alaina Coates to Minnesota in exchange for Minnesota's third round pick in the 2020 Draft.
February 12, 2020: The Sky traded Astou Ndour to Dallas in exchange for Dallas' first round pick in the 2021 Draft.
February 12, 2020: The Sky traded Kaite Lou Samuelson and a first round pick in the 2021 Draft in exchange for Azurá Stevens.
February 9, 2021: The Sky traded their second round pick in the 2022 Draft for the 16th pick in the 2021 Draft (from Dallas).
May 9, 2021: The Sky traded Gabby Williams to the Los Angeles Sparks in exchange for Stephanie Watts and the rights to Leonie Fiebich.
June 2, 2021: The Sky traded, Shyla Heal, their third round pick in the 2022 Draft, and the option to swap pick positions in the first round of the 2022 Draft to the Dallas Wings in exchange for Dana Evans.
February 3, 2022: The Sky traded Diamond DeShields to Phoenix in exchange for Julie Allemand and the Phoenix Mercury's 2023 first round pick.
March 20, 2022: They Sky traded Lexie Brown to Los Angeles in exchange for Li Yueru.

All-Stars
2006: Candice Dupree
2007: Candice Dupree
2008: No All-Star Game
2009: Candice Dupree, Sylvia Fowles, Jia Perkins
2010: Sylvia Fowles
2011: Sylvia Fowles, Epiphanny Prince, Courtney Vandersloot
2012: No All-Star Game
2013: Elena Delle Donne, Sylvia Fowles, Epiphany Prince
2014: Jessica Breland, Elena Delle Donne
2015: Elena Delle Donne, Cappie Pondexter ·
2016: No All-Star Game
2017: Stefanie Dolson, Allie Quigley
2018: Allie Quigley
2019: Diamond DeShields, Allie Quigley, Courtney Vandersloot
2020: No All-Star Game
2021: Kahleah Copper, Candace Parker, Courtney Vandersloot
2022: Kahleah Copper, Emma Meesseman, Candace Parker, Courtney Vandersloot

Olympians
2008: Sylvia Fowles
2012: Swin Cash, Sylvia Fowles
2016: Elena Delle Donne, Erika de Souza (BRA), Clarissa Dos Santos (BRA)
2020: Astou Ndour (ESP), Stefanie Dolson

Honors and awards

2006 All-Rookie Team: Candice Dupree
2007 All-Rookie Team: Armintie Price
2008 All-Defensive Second Team: Sylvia Fowles
2008 All-Rookie Team: Sylvia Fowles
2010 All-WNBA First Team: Sylvia Fowles
2010 All-Defensive First Team: Sylvia Fowles
2010 All-Rookie Team: Epiphanny Prince
2010 Stars at the Sun Game MVP: Sylvia Fowles
2011 All-WNBA Second Team: Sylvia Fowles
2011 Defensive Player of the Year: Sylvia Fowles
2011 All-Defensive First Team: Sylvia Fowles
2011 All-Rookie Team: Courtney Vandersloot
2012 All-WNBA Second Team: Sylvia Fowles
2012 All-Defensive First Team: Sylvia Fowles
2013 Rookie of the Year: Elena Delle Donne
2013 Defensive Player of the Year: Sylvia Fowles
2013 All-Rookie Team: Elena Delle Donne
2013 All-Defensive First Team: Sylvia Fowles
2013 Peak Performer (Rebounding): Sylvia Fowles
2014 WNBA Sixth Woman of the Year: Allie Quigley
2014 All-Defensive Second Team: Sylvia Fowles
2015 WNBA MVP: Elena Delle Donne
2015 WNBA Sixth Woman of the Year: Allie Quigley
2015 Peak Performer (Scoring): Elena Delle Donne
2015 Peak Performer (Assists): Courtney Vandersloot
2015 All-WNBA First Team: Elena Delle Donne
2015 All-WNBA Second Team: Courtney Vandersloot
2016 All-Rookie Team: Imani Boyette
2017 Peak Performer (Assists): Courtney Vandersloot
2018 All-WNBA Second Team: Courtney Vandersloot
2018 All-Rookie Team: Diamond DeShields
2018 Peak Performer (Assists): Courtney Vandersloot
2019 Peak Performer (Assists): Courtney Vandersloot
2019 Coach of the Year: James Wade
2019 All-WNBA First Team: Courtney Vandersloot
2019 All-WNBA Second Team: Diamond DeShields
2020 Peak Performer (Assists): Courtney Vandersloot
2020 All-WNBA First Team: Courtney Vandersloot
2021 All-WNBA Second Team: Courtney Vandersloot
2021 Finals MVP: Kahleah Copper
2022 Basketball Executive of the Year: James Wade
2022 All-WNBA First Team: Candace Parker
2022 All-Rookie Team: Rebekah Gardner

Arenas
UIC Pavilion (2006–2009)
Allstate Arena (2010–2017)
Wintrust Arena (2018–present)

Notes

References

Sources

February 28, 2006 Chicago Sky press release announcing Michelle Williams on its ownership group
Steven Key named Head Coach/General Manager

External links

WNBA Official Website 
Chicago Sky Schedule

 
2005 establishments in Illinois
Basketball teams in Illinois
Basketball teams established in 2005
Women's National Basketball Association teams
Sky
Events in Chicago
Events in Rosemont, Illinois